The Beach Side of Life is the third full-length album from German electronic composer and producer Roger-Pierre Shah - released under his Sunlounger alias. It was released through Armada Music on October 22, 2010.

Track listing

External links
 Rogershah.net
 Facebook page
Myspace page
ArmadaMusic.com news article, September 2010

2010 albums
Armada Music albums
Roger Shah albums